John D. Silva (1920-2012) was the chief engineer for KTLA-TV in Los Angeles, California and is most famous for inventing the first telecopter, or a helicopter fitted with a TV camera in 1958. 

John D. Silva was born in San Diego, California  on February 20, 1920 and studied engineering at Stanford University. In 1942 he joined the Navy as a radar operator and was among the 91 wounded when the destroyer Shea was attacked by Japanese bombers during World War II. After the war, he moved to Los Angeles to join Paramount Pictures, which at the time was operating an experimental TV station, W6XYZ, later to become KTLA-TV. He was KTLA’s chief engineer for 21 years and was where he invented the telecopter. 

Silva began designing and building an aerial broadcasting studio with a rented bell helicopter in a North Hollywood backyard in secret so as not to alert other TV stations. KTLA spent $40,000 on broadcasting equipment for the helicopter. Silva also configured the equipment to weigh a mere 368 pounds rather than its usual 2,000 pounds so that the helicopter would be able to take off. He later won an Emmy in 1974 for his invention as well as over 40 national and local awards for his live coverage of various events.

In 1978 Silva left KTLA to become an electronics design consultant.

Silva died of complications of pneumonia on November 27, 2012 in Camarillo, California at age 92.

References

1920 births
2012 deaths
20th-century American engineers
United States Navy personnel of World War II
Emmy Award winners
Engineers from California
Paramount Pictures
People from Camarillo, California
People from Los Angeles
People from San Diego
Stanford University School of Engineering alumni